The Battle of Lützen, fought on 16 November 1632, is considered one of the most important battles of the Thirty Years' War. A combined Swedish-German army led by Gustavus Adolphus narrowly defeated an Imperial force under Albrecht von Wallenstein. Both sides suffered heavy casualties, with Gustavus among the dead.    

The first part of the battle featured a series of frontal attacks by the Swedes, which nearly succeeded before being repulsed by Imperial cavalry under Pappenheim. Gustavus was killed trying to reform his shattered infantry, but his subordinates rallied their men and supported by close range artillery fire overran the Imperial centre just before nightfall. Wallenstein withdrew in good order although he abandoned his wounded, many of his guns and most of his supply train.     

Despite the loss of their king, the Swedes continued the war under the direction of Axel Oxenstierna and formed the Heilbronn League with their German allies in April 1633. Backed by French subsidies, the coalition defeated an Imperial army under von Gronsfeld at Oldendorf in July. Wallenstein's alleged failure to support his colleague and rumours he was contemplating switching sides led to his removal and assassination by Imperial agents in February 1634.

Background
Swedish intervention in the Thirty Years' War began in June 1630 when nearly 18,000 troops under Gustavus Adolphus landed in the Duchy of Pomerania. Backed by French subsidies and supported by Saxony and Brandenburg-Prussia, he defeated Imperial armies at Breitenfeld in September 1631, then Rain in April 1632. However, this drew him deep into Southern Germany and Imperial general Albrecht von Wallenstein established himself at Fürth, threatening to cut his lines of communication to the north. The largest battle of the war took place on 3 September, when an assault on the Imperial camp outside the town was bloodily repulsed, arguably the greatest blunder committed by Gustavus during his German campaign.

After this success, Wallenstein joined Heinrich Holk in attacking Saxony, hoping to force John George I, Elector of Saxony, out of the war and obliging Gustavus to follow him. Leipzig was captured in early November and on 14th Wallenstein decided to establish winter quarters there, believing the Swedes would not risk giving battle. However, next day the Swedes learned Pappenheim's corps of 5,800 men had been detached and sent to Halle. This left Wallenstein with between 13,000 to 15,000 men, facing an estimated 18,738 under Gustavus, who decided to take advantage of his numerical superiority to attack, and quickly advanced from his base at Naumburg. As well as troops in Swedish service, his force included 850 from  Hesse-Kassel and some 2,000 Saxons, although their main army was absent.       

Late in the afternoon of 15 November, the Swedes ran into an Imperial outpost at the Rippach stream, about 5–6 kilometres south of Lützen. Seeing the danger, Wallenstein ordered Pappenheim to return as quickly as possible; having received the note after midnight, he immediately set off with his cavalry, leaving the infantry to follow. The Swedes halted two kilometres outside the town and camped in battle order, while the Imperial troops worked through the night to build defensive positions along the main Lützen-Leipzig road, also known as the Via Regia. The ground they occupied was mostly flat except for their right flank, which Wallenstein anchored on a low hill next to three windmills, supported by his main artillery battery.

Battle

The Swedish advance was hampered first by morning mist, then having to cross the Flossgraben canal (see Map). As a result, their attack did not begin until 11:00 am, a delay which gave Pappenheim time to reach the battlefield and negated the initial Swedish numerical superiority. Although Bernhard of Saxe-Weimar made little progress against Wallenstein's right, Gustavus overran a line of musketeers holding the ditch along the Lützen-Leipzig road, crossed it, then swung round to outflank the Imperial left. This was the situation around 12:00 pm when Pappenheim arrived on the battlefield with 2,300 cavalry.

He immediately charged and drove the Swedish infantry back across the road, with several elite units effectively wiped out or losing up to 65% of their strength. The Imperial troops also suffered heavy casualties, particularly among their senior officers, including Pappenheim, who was fatally wounded and died while being evacuated in a coach. At the same time, Holk launched a counterattack on the Swedish centre; by 13:00, both armies were losing cohesion and the battle degenerated into a confused series of firefights between opposing units.

By now, officers on both sides were trying to reorganise their troops, the smoke from the burning houses in Lützen blowing across the battlefield and making it almost impossible to see. While trying to rally his shattered infantry, Gustavus and his entourage got lost and ran into an Imperial cavalry unit; he was shot three times and fell dead from his horse, his body not recovered until after the fighting ended that evening. The Swedish reserve under Knyphausen managed to hold the line, providing time for their colleagues to reform and the fighting paused around 15:00.

Although news of Gustavus' death soon spread through the Swedish army, Wallenstein refused to believe it while many of his own troops were in equally bad shape. Much of Pappenheim's cavalry fled and told the infantry coming from Halle the battle was lost, although the latter continued marching towards Lützen. Several units looted their own baggage train, accompanied by camp followers who escaped on the horses needed to transport guns and supply wagons.

There are few reliable eyewitness accounts for the second phase of the battle and events are thus harder to reconstruct. One suggestion is Knyphausen advised retreat but when Bernhard of Saxe-Weimar continued his attack on the Imperial left, he moved his troops forward and crossed the Via Regia once again. As they did so, they captured the small battery in the centre (see Battle Map) and used it to fire on the Imperial left, which slowly withdrew out of range. Around 16:00, Bernard of Saxe-Weimar finally over-ran Lützen, then seized the main Imperial battery next to the windmills which were turned on his retreating opponents.

By 17:00 and with dusk falling, fighting subsided as Wallenstein ordered his troops to retire, leaving the field to the Swedes; he was also forced to abandon his remaining guns and supply wagons due to the loss of his baggage horses. After marching all day, Pappenheim's infantry, about 2,900 strong, arrived on the battlefield after nightfall; they wished to counterattack but instead Wallenstein ordered them to cover his retreat into Leipzig. The Swedes were finally able to recover the body of their king from under a heap of corpses on the Imperial side of the ditch which had been the scene of bitter fighting throughout the day.

Aftermath

While Imperial casualties of 5,160 killed or wounded were lower than Swedish losses of around 6,000, Wallenstein decided he could not hold Leipzig and withdrew into Bohemia, leaving behind over 1,200 wounded, who were taken prisoner. During this retreat, the Imperialists were harassed by Saxon peasantry angry at the destruction of their crops and suffered significant additional casualties. Wallenstein's withdrawal and the capture of his artillery allowed the Swedes to claim Lützen as a victory, while they also achieved their tactical objective of forcing him out of Saxony, but the battle is chiefly significant for the death of Gustavus.

Although his loss was greeted with dismay at home and within the wider European Protestant community, his allies were more ambivalent. French chief minister Cardinal Richelieu, who provided the financial subsidies that supported the Swedish army, had increasingly clashed with Gustavus over strategic objectives. There were even rumours among contemporaries he was involved in his death and while there is no evidence for this, his death re-confirmed French leadership of the anti-Habsburg alliance. Saxony and Brandenburg had grown disillusioned with the Swedish alliance, which led to heavy loss of civilian life from plague and starvation, while the occupation of Swedish Pomerania threatened their own economic interests in the Baltic trade.

Since Gustavus was succeeded by his six year old daughter Christina, direction of policy was taken over by the Privy Council of Sweden, headed by Axel Oxenstierna. Appointed Chancellor in January 1633, he decided Sweden could gain adequate compensation for its investment only by continuing the war. After ensuring control of the army, his next step was to replace the previous loose alliance with a more formal structure; this was driven by a perceived need to stabilise the Swedish state and doubts over the reliability of his allies. 

Richelieu resumed payment of subsidies to Sweden on 7 April and on 27th, Sweden and its German Protestant allies formed the Heilbronn League. Oxenstierna was appointed League Director, with an absolute veto over military affairs, supported by a council of ten advisors, three of whom were Swedes. Its members agreed to support an army of 78,000 men, although they provided less than a third of the money needed; the balance was paid by France to Sweden directly, ensuring control over the League. The German states agreed to continue fighting until Sweden obtained "just compensation," while Oxenstierna promised them a return to pre-1618 borders. In July, the coalition defeated an Imperial army under von Gronsfeld at Oldendorf; Wallenstein's alleged refusal to support his colleague and rumours he was contemplating switching sides led to his removal and assassination by Imperial agents in February 1634.

Legacy

The day after the battle, a granite boulder was placed near the spot where Gustavus Adolphus fell, known as the Schwedenstein; in 1832, an iron canopy was erected over the stone, with a chapel built nearby in 1907. The battle was fought on 16 November according to the Gregorian calendar or 6 November according to the Julian calendar, which was then in use in Sweden. Despite adopting the Gregorian calendar in 1753, the Swedes still commemorate Gustavus Adolphus Day on 6 November each year.

In 2011, a mass grave containing the remains of 47 soldiers was found in an area where a Swedish unit known as the Blue Brigade was reportedly overrun by Pappenheim's cavalry. Examination of the remains showed the average age was 28, while evidence of healed injuries indicate they were veterans; more than half had been hit by gunfire, an unusually high number for this period.

Notes

References

Sources

Lutzen
1632 in Europe
Lützen
Lutzen
Lutzen
Lützen
Gustavus Adolphus of Sweden
Albrecht von Wallenstein
Lützen